The Tanimbar starling (Aplonis crassa) is a species of starling in the family Sturnidae. It is endemic to Indonesia.

Its natural habitats are subtropical or tropical moist lowland forests and subtropical or tropical mangrove forests. It is threatened by habitat loss.

References

Tanimbar starling
Birds of the Tanimbar Islands
Tanimbar starling
Tanimbar starling
Taxonomy articles created by Polbot